Top 5 Hits may refer to:

 Top 5 Hits (Jump5 album), 2006
 Top 5 Hits, a 2006 album by Rebecca St. James
 Top 5 Hits, a 2006 album by ZOEgirl